Chisaki Morito (森戸知沙希; born February 19, 2000) is a Japanese pop singer, dancer, and a 14th-generation member of Japanese girl group Morning Musume and is a former member of Country Girls up until their disbandment in 2019.

Biography

Early life
Chisaki Morito was born on February 19, 2000, in Tochigi, Japan.

2014–present: Career in Hello! Project
In mid 2014, Morito participated in the Morning Musume '14 (Golden) Audition! for an opportunity to become a 12th-generation member, but failed to join the group.  On November 5, it was announced that Morito would be joining the Country Musume revival group Country Girls.

On June 9, 2017, it was announced that Country Girls would be ceasing regular activities and that three of the members, including Morito, would be transferring to other Hello! Project groups. On June 26, through a special episode of Hello! Project Station, it was revealed that Morito would be joining Morning Musume as a 14th generation member while remaining a concurrent member of Country Girls.

Discography
For Chisaki Morito's releases with Country Girls and Morning Musume, see Country Girls (band)#Discography and Morning Musume discography.

Bibliography

Photobooks
 (February 19 2017, Wani Books)
Say Cheese! (June 27, 2019, Wani Books )
Crossroads (October 1, 2020, Wani Books )

Filmography

References 

2000 births
Living people
Morning Musume members
Japanese women pop singers
Japanese female idols